Rise and Walk: The Dennis Byrd Story is a 1994 American drama film directed by Michael Dinner and written by Sally Nemeth, John Miglis and Mark Levin. It is based on the 1993 book Rise and Walk: The Trial and Triumph of Dennis Byrd by Dennis Byrd and Mike D'Orso. The film stars Peter Berg, Kathryn Morris, Wolfgang Bodison, Johann Carlo, Steve Fitchpatrick and Patrick Warburton. The film premiered on Fox on February 28, 1994.

Plot

Cast 
Peter Berg as Dennis Byrd
Kathryn Morris as Angela
Wolfgang Bodison as Marvin Washington
Johann Carlo as Joanne
Steve Fitchpatrick as Jeff Lageman
Patrick Warburton as Scott Mersereau
Carrie Snodgress as Mrs. Byrd
Zakes Mokae as Harding
Steven Anderson
William Forward	
Dennis Howard
Allan Royal
Richie Allan
Bert Remsen as Mr. Robinson
Dan Lauria as The Coach
James Troesh as Mr. Montrose
Ryan Slater as Young Dennis
Brent O'Plotnik as Young Doug
Jay Michael Ferguson as Young Danny
Johnny Judkins as Doug
David Harrod as Danny
McKenzie Smith as Ashtin
Matthew Tompkins as Eddie
David Eversole as Tulsa Coach
Juli Erickson as Grandma
Larry Flynn as Cooley
Mitch Jelniker as Mike Jacklin
Reverend McNabb as Himself
Walker Randall as Darnell
Allan Graf as Jets Assistant Coach
David Allen as Lineman
Reese Morrison as Kansas City QB
Ryan Phillips as Tulsa Defensive Capt.
Keith Warrior as Tulsa Quarterback
Nathan Wooten as Dodson
William Pulley as Angela's Father
Wanda Wooley as Angela's Mother

References

External links
 

1994 television films
1994 films
1994 drama films
Fox network original films
American drama television films
1990s English-language films
1990s American films
Films set in 1992
American football films
Biographical films about sportspeople
New York Jets
Cultural depictions of players of American football
Films based on biographies
Sports films based on actual events
Films directed by Michael Dinner
Films set in Oklahoma
Films set in New Jersey
Films shot in Oklahoma